José García Guerrero (October 29, 1914  December 23, 1991), better known as José Guerrero, was a Spanish artist, notable for his abstract expressionist paintings, who spent much of his working life in U.S.A.

Biography 
Guerrero was born in Granada, where, from 1930 to 1934, he attended art classes at the Escuela de Artes y Oficios. In 1940, on the advice of his friend Federico García Lorca, he moved to Madrid, where he continued his studies until 1945 at the Escuela Superior de Bellas Artes de San Fernando. The same year, he received a grant from the French government to study fresco painting for one year at the École des Beaux-Arts, Paris. During his time in Paris, he saw works by artists such as Juan Gris, Paul Klee, Joan Miró, Pablo Picasso, and especially Henri Matisse, whose influence can be seen in the  landscapes and rural scenes Guerrero painted after returning to Spain.

From 1946, Guerrero spent several years traveling across Europe, staying in Bern, Brussels, London, Paris, and Rome. In Rome, he became friends with the artist brothers Afro and Mirko Basaldella. He also met Roxanne Whittier Pollock, an American journalist. The couple married in 1949, and moved to the United States, staying first in Philadelphia and settling a year later in New York.

Guerrero now became acquainted with many prominent members of the American avant-garde, including the artists Willem de Kooning, Franz Kline, Robert Motherwell, Ad Reinhardt, Mark Rothko, and Theodoros Stamos, and with James Johnson Sweeney, art critic and director of the Guggenheim Museum. Guerrero painted his last figurative work (a self-portrait) in 1950, and thereafter devoted himself to abstract expressionism. In 1954, his paintings were exhibited at the Betty Parsons Gallery, and in Sweeney's exhibition Younger American Painters: A Selection. He used his skills in fresco to collaborate with architects on postwar reconstruction projects, winning a fellowship from the Graham Foundation of Chicago for such work. In 1965, he returned to Spain, and from then on divided his time between there and U.S.A. He produced portfolios of graphic works to accompany the poems of Jorge Guillen, Stanley Kunitz and others. He died in Barcelona in 1991, survived by his wife, a son and a daughter.

Assessment 
According to an assessment on the Guggenheim Foundation's website, in Guerrero's early abstract style "simplified, biomorphic forms float in a quasi-monochromatic background". By the mid-1950s it "had become more gestural, expressing a deeper sense of urgency, as he loosened his brushstroke and introduced a controlled dripping technique". After his first return to Spain, he "reintegrat[ed] purer colors in his works, distant from the anxiety-ridden, predominantly black paintings of the late 1950s". His style continued to evolve through the 1970s and 1980s, "as he created orderly and rhythmic vertical compositions, followed by increasingly dynamic works in which brilliant hues took the lead". According to art critic Grace Glueck, he was "[k]nown for big, vibrantly colored paintings whose abstract imagery suggested landscape, primitive architecture and atmospheric events". She quotes him as saying that the structure of his paintings was based on "vertical thrusts or horizontal tensions and diagonal crisscrossings".

Exhibitions and collections 
His work is held by several prominent collections, including those of the Guggenheim, Whitney and Brooklyn Museums in New York, and from 2000 in the Centro José Guerrero, Granada. His solo exhibitions include: 1952Smithsonian Institution, Washington, D.C.; 1954 and 1958Betty Parsons Gallery; 1964Galería Juana Mordó, Madrid (es); 1981Escuela de Artes y Oficios; 1990Museo de Arte Contemporáneo, Seville (es). In 1994, there was a major retrospective of his work at Museo Nacional Centro de Arte Reina Sofía, Madrid. In 2014, an exhibition organized by Yolanda Romero (director from 2000 of Centro José Guerrero) entitled José Guerrero: The Presence of Black, 1950-1966 was toured in Granada, Madrid and Barcelona.

References

External links 
 

1914 births
1991 deaths
People from Granada
Real Academia de Bellas Artes de San Fernando alumni
École des Beaux-Arts alumni
20th-century Spanish painters
20th-century Spanish male artists
Spanish male painters
Spanish Expressionist painters
Spanish expatriates in the United States